Devighat Hydropower Station is a 14.1 MW cascade project of Trishuli Hydropower Station. The station is located at Bidur Municipality in Nuwakot, Nepal. The plant was commissioned in 1984. The plant was developed jointly by the Government of India and the Government of Nepal. The project cost was NPR 750 Million. The plant was overhauled in 2011 to regain efficiency. The design flow is  	45.66 m3/s and the rated head is 40.5 m.

See also

Nepal Electricity Authority

References

Hydroelectric power stations in Nepal

Run-of-the-river power stations
Dams in Nepal
1984 establishments in Nepal
Buildings and structures in Nuwakot District